The 5000 and 10000 metres distances for men in the 2008–09 ISU Speed Skating World Cup were contested over six races on six occasions, out of a total of nine World Cup occasions for the season, with the first occasion taking place in Berlin, Germany, on 7–9 November 2008, and the final occasion taking place in Salt Lake City, United States, on 6–7 March 2009.

Sven Kramer of the Netherlands won the cup, while the defending champion, Håvard Bøkko of Norway, came second, and Bob de Jong of the Netherlands came third.

Top three

Race medallists

Final standings
Standings as of 8 March 2009 (end of the season).

References

Men 5000